Midnight Express is a 1977 nonfiction book by Billy Hayes and William Hoffer about Hayes' experience as a young American who was sent to a Turkish prison. The US had declared a "War on Drugs" in the early 1970s, and Hayes was made an example of for trying to smuggle hashish out of Turkey. When his sentence was extended to 30 years, he decided to make his escape.

The book was adapted by Oliver Stone and directed by Alan Parker into a 1978 feature film of the same name that took many liberties with the book.

After reading the book, Australian country music singer Shane Nicholson recorded an album and title track, Bad Machines, which was inspired by the book.

Editions
Dutton, 1977.  (First edition)

References

1977 non-fiction books
Autobiographies adapted into films
Law enforcement in Turkey
Turkey–United States relations
Works about cannabis trafficking
Memoirs of imprisonment
Cannabis in Turkey
E. P. Dutton books